Jean Louise Cohen (born November 28, 1946) is the Nell and Herbert Singer Professor of Political Thought at Columbia University. She specializes in contemporary political and legal theory with particular research interests in democratic theory, critical theory, civil society, gender and the law.

Academic career 
She received her PhD in 1979 from the New School for Social Research.  She served as Assistant Professor of Social Science at Bennington College from 1980-1983 and as Assistant Professor of Sociology at the University of California, Berkeley (1984) before coming to Columbia.  Cohen has been Associate Editor of the journals Telos, Constellations and Dissent. She was elected one of the three editors in chief of Constellations in May 2014. Her current projects concern rethinking state and popular sovereignty in the epoch of globalization, as well as defending the law-making capacities of secular polities from religiously motivated legal pluralism. Jean L. Cohen serves on the Editorial Advisory Board of the Council's journal, Ethics & International Affairs. Civil Society and Political Theory, co-authored with Andrew Arato, is viewed by many as a seminal text on contemporary civil society.

Research interests 

Cohen's areas of research are: sovereignty, international law, global justice, governance, contemporary political theory, continental political theory, Germany, France, American legal theory, feminist theory, civil society, privacy, gender and sexuality, social movements, rights, and state and religion.

Publications

Articles and Chapters 
 Whose Sovereignty? Empire Versus International Law
 Changing Paradigms of Citizenship and the Exclusiveness of the Demos
 Does voluntary association make democracy work
 “Civil Society and Globalization: Rethinking the Categories," in Diversity and its discontents by Neil J. Smelser, Jeffrey C. Alexander

Books 

 Cohen, J. L. (1982). Class and civil society: The limits of Marxian critical theory. Amherst: University of Massachusetts Press. 
 Cohen, J. L., & Arato, A. (1997). Civil society and political theory. Cambridge, Mass: MIT Press. 
 Cohen, J. L. (2002). Regulating intimacy: A new legal paradigm. Princeton, N.J: Princeton Univ. Press. 
 Cohen, J. L. (2012). Globalization and sovereignty: Rethinking legality, legitimacy and constitutionalism. 
 Changing paradigms of citizenship and the exclusiveness of the demos
 Cohen, J. L., & Arato, A. (2021). Populism and civil society: The challenge to constitutional democracy.

References 

1946 births
Living people
American women political scientists
American political scientists
Critical theorists
Columbia University faculty
The New School alumni